Kamnjek is a former settlement in the Municipality of Kranj in the Upper Carniola region of Slovenia. It now a hamlet of the village of Letenice. It lies west of the village center of Letenice, in a small damp valley on a road leading into the east side of the Udin Woods.

Name
Like similar names (e.g., Kamnik, Kamenik, Kamnje, Kamno, etc.), the name Kamnjek is ultimately derived from the Slavic common noun *kamy (accusative: *kamenь) 'stone', referring to the local geography. In the past the German name was Kamnik.

History
Kamnjek was merged with the village of Letenice in 1953, ending its existence as a separate settlement.

References

External links
Kamnjek on Geopedia

Populated places in the City Municipality of Kranj